This is a list of Proteaceae that occur in Australia. It includes all Proteaceae taxa listed as accepted names in the Australian Plant Name Index.

 Acidonia
 Acidonia microcarpa
 Adenanthos
 Adenanthos acanthophyllus
 Adenanthos apiculatus
 Adenanthos argyreus
 Adenanthos barbiger
 Adenanthos cacomorphus
 Adenanthos cuneatus
 Adenanthos cygnorum
 Adenanthos cygnorum subsp. chamaephyton
 Adenanthos cygnorum subsp. cygnorum
 Adenanthos detmoldii
 Adenanthos dobagii
 Adenanthos dobsonii
 Adenanthos drummondii
 Adenanthos ellipticus
 Adenanthos eyrei
 Adenanthos filifolius
 Adenanthos flavidiflorus
 Adenanthos forrestii
 Adenanthos glabrescens
 Adenanthos glabrescens subsp. exasperatus
 Adenanthos glabrescens subsp. glabrescens
 Adenanthos gracilipes
 Adenanthos ileticos
 Adenanthos labillardierei
 Adenanthos linearis
 Adenanthos macropodianus
 Adenanthos meisneri
 Adenanthos obovatus
 Adenanthos oreophilus
 Adenanthos pungens
 Adenanthos pungens subsp. effusus
 Adenanthos pungens subsp. pungens
 Adenanthos sericeus
 Adenanthos sericeus subsp. sericeus
 Adenanthos sericeus subsp. sphalma
 Adenanthos stictus
 Adenanthos terminalis
 Adenanthos velutinus
 Adenanthos venosus
 Agastachys
 Agastachys odorata
 Alloxylon 
 Alloxylon flammeum  (type species)
 Alloxylon pinnatum 
 Alloxylon wickhamii 
 Athertonia
 Athertonia diversifolia
 Austromuellera
 Austromuellera trinervia
 Austromuellera valida
 Banksia
 Banksia aculeata
 Banksia aemula
 Banksia ashbyi
 Banksia attenuata
 Banksia audax
 Banksia baueri
 Banksia baxteri
 Banksia benthamiana
 Banksia blechnifolia
 Banksia brownii
 Banksia burdettii
 Banksia caleyi
 Banksia candolleana
 Banksia canei
 Banksia chamaephyton
 Banksia coccinea
 Banksia conferta
 Banksia cuneata
 Banksia dentata
 Banksia dryandroides
 Banksia elderiana
 Banksia elegans
 Banksia epica
 Banksia ericifolia
 Banksia gardneri
 Banksia gardneri var. brevidentata
 Banksia gardneri var. gardneri
 Banksia gardneri var. hiemalis
 Banksia goodii
 Banksia grandis
 Banksia grossa
 Banksia hookeriana
 Banksia ilicifolia
 Banksia incana
 Banksia integrifolia
 Banksia laevigata
 Banksia laevigata subsp. fuscolutea
 Banksia laevigata subsp. laevigata
 Banksia lanata
 Banksia laricina
 Banksia lemanniana
 Banksia leptophylla
 Banksia leptophylla var. leptophylla
 Banksia leptophylla var. melletica
 Banksia lindleyana
 Banksia littoralis
 Banksia lullfitzii
 Banksia marginata
 Banksia media
 Banksia meisneri
 Banksia menziesii
 Banksia micrantha
 Banksia nutans
 Banksia nutans var. cernuella
 Banksia nutans var. nutans
 Banksia oblongifolia
 Banksia occidentalis
 Banksia oligantha
 Banksia oreophila
 Banksia ornata
 Banksia paludosa
 Banksia petiolaris
 Banksia pilostylis
 Banksia plagiocarpa
 Banksia praemorsa
 Banksia prionotes
 Banksia pulchella
 Banksia quercifolia
 Banksia repens
 Banksia robur
 Banksia saxicola
 Banksia scabrella
 Banksia sceptrum
 Banksia seminuda
 Banksia serrata
 Banksia solandri
 Banksia speciosa
 Banksia sphaerocarpa
 Banksia sphaerocarpa var. caesia
 Banksia sphaerocarpa var. dolichostyla
 Banksia sphaerocarpa var. sphaerocarpa
 Banksia spinulosa
 Banksia spinulosa var. collina
 Banksia spinulosa var. cunninghamii
 Banksia spinulosa var. neoanglica
 Banksia spinulosa var. spinulosa
 Banksia telmatiaea
 Banksia tricuspis
 Banksia verticillata
 Banksia victoriae
 Banksia violacea
 Bellendena
 Bellendena montana
 Buckinghamia
 Buckinghamia celsissima
 Buckinghamia ferruginiflora
 Cardwellia
 Cardwellia sublimis
 Carnarvonia 
 Carnarvonia araliifolia 
 Carnarvonia araliifolia var. araliifolia
 Carnarvonia araliifolia var. montana 
 Catalepidia 
 Catalepidia heyana 
 Cenarrhenes
 Cenarrhenes nitida
 Conospermum
 Conospermum acerosum
 Conospermum amoenum
 Conospermum brachyphyllum
 Conospermum bracteosum
 Conospermum brownii
 Conospermum burgessiorum
 Conospermum caeruleum
 Conospermum canaliculatum
 Conospermum capitatum
 Conospermum coerulescens
 Conospermum crassinervium
 Conospermum croniniae
 Conospermum densiflorum
 Conospermum distichum
 Conospermum eatoniae
 Conospermum ellipticum
 Conospermum ephedroides
 Conospermum ericifolium
 Conospermum filifolium
 Conospermum flexuosum
 Conospermum floribundum
 Conospermum glumaceum
 Conospermum huegelii
 Conospermum incurvum
 Conospermum leianthum
 Conospermum longifolium
 Conospermum longifolium subsp. angustifolium
 Conospermum longifolium subsp. longifolium
 Conospermum longifolium subsp. mediale
 Conospermum mitchellii
 Conospermum nervosum
 Conospermum patens
 Conospermum petiolare
 Conospermum polycephalum
 Conospermum scaposum
 Conospermum sphacelatum
 Conospermum stoechadis
 Conospermum taxifolium
 Conospermum tenuifolium
 Conospermum teretifolium
 Conospermum toddii
 Conospermum triplinervium
 Conospermum undulatum
 Darlingia
 Darlingia darlingiana
 Darlingia ferruginea
 Dryandra
 Dryandra arborea
 Dryandra arctotidis
 Dryandra armata
 Dryandra baxteri
 Dryandra bipinnatifida
 Dryandra blechnifolia
 Dryandra brownii
 Dryandra calophylla
 Dryandra carlinoides
 Dryandra cirsioides
 Dryandra comosa
 Dryandra concinna
 Dryandra conferta
 Dryandra cuneata
 Dryandra cynaroides
 Dryandra drummondii
 Dryandra erythrocephala
 Dryandra falcata
 Dryandra ferruginea
 Dryandra foliolata
 Dryandra foliosissima
 Dryandra formosa
 Dryandra fraseri
 Dryandra hewardiana
 Dryandra horrida
 Dryandra kippistiana
 Dryandra lindleyana
 Dryandra longifolia
 Dryandra mimica
 Dryandra mucronulata
 Dryandra nana
 Dryandra nervosa
 Dryandra nivea
 Dryandra nobilis
 Dryandra obtusa
 Dryandra plumosa
 Dryandra polycephala
 Dryandra praemorsa
 Dryandra praemorsa var. praemorsa
 Dryandra preissii
 Dryandra proteoides
 Dryandra pteridifolia
 Dryandra pulchella
 Dryandra purdieana
 Dryandra quercifolia
 Dryandra sclerophylla
 Dryandra seneciifolia
 Dryandra serra
 Dryandra serratuloides
 Dryandra sessilis
 Dryandra shanklandiorum
 Dryandra shuttleworthiana
 Dryandra speciosa
 Dryandra squarrosa
 Dryandra stenoprion
 Dryandra stuposa
 Dryandra subpinnatifida
 Dryandra subulata
 Dryandra tenuifolia
 Dryandra tenuifolia var. tenuifolia
 Dryandra tortifolia
 Dryandra tridentata
 Dryandra vestita
 Eidothea 
 Eidothea hardeniana 
 Eidothea zoexylocarya 
 Floydia
 Floydia praealta
 Franklandia
 Franklandia fucifolia
 Franklandia triaristata
 Gevuina
 Gevuina bleasdalei
 Grevillea
 Grevillea acacioides
 Grevillea acanthifolia
 Grevillea acanthifolia subsp. acanthifolia
 Grevillea acanthifolia subsp. paludosa
 Grevillea acanthifolia subsp. stenomera
 Grevillea acerata
 Grevillea acrobotrya
 Grevillea acuaria
 Grevillea adenotricha
 Grevillea agrifolia
 Grevillea albiflora
 Grevillea alpina
 Grevillea alpivaga
 Grevillea amplexans
 Grevillea anethifolia
 Grevillea aneura
 Grevillea angulata
 Grevillea annulifera
 Grevillea aquifolium
 Grevillea arenaria
 Grevillea arenaria subsp. arenaria
 Grevillea argyrophylla
 Grevillea armigera
 Grevillea asparagoides
 Grevillea aspera
 Grevillea aspera
 Grevillea aspleniifolia
 Grevillea asteriscosa
 Grevillea australis
 Grevillea baileyana
 Grevillea banksii
 Grevillea barklyana
 Grevillea batrachioides
 Grevillea baueri
 Grevillea baueri subsp. asperula
 Grevillea baueri subsp. baueri
 Grevillea baxteri
 Grevillea beadleana
 Grevillea beardiana
 Grevillea bedggoodiana
 Grevillea benthamiana
 Grevillea berryana
 Grevillea biformis
 Grevillea bipinnatifida
 Grevillea biternata
 Grevillea brachystachya
 Grevillea brachystylis
 Grevillea bracteosa
 Grevillea brevifolia
 Grevillea buxifolia
 Grevillea buxifolia subsp. buxifolia
 Grevillea byrnesii
 Grevillea cagiana
 Grevillea calcicola
 Grevillea caleyi
 Grevillea candelabroides
 Grevillea candicans
 Grevillea candolleana
 Grevillea capitellata
 Grevillea ceratocarpa
 Grevillea christineae
 Grevillea chrysophaea
 Grevillea cirsiifolia
 Grevillea coccinea
 Grevillea commutata
 Grevillea concinna
 Grevillea concinna subsp. concinna
 Grevillea concinna subsp. lemanniana
 Grevillea confertifolia
 Grevillea coriacea
 Grevillea costata
 Grevillea crassifolia
 Grevillea crithmifolia
 Grevillea cunninghamii
 Grevillea curviloba
 Grevillea cyranostigma
 Grevillea decipiens
 Grevillea decora
 Grevillea decurrens
 Grevillea deflexa
 Grevillea depauperata
 Grevillea didymobotrya
 Grevillea didymobotrya subsp. didymobotrya
 Grevillea didymobotrya subsp. involuta
 Grevillea dielsiana
 Grevillea diffusa
 Grevillea diffusa subsp. diffusa
 Grevillea diffusa subsp. filipendula
 Grevillea dimidiata
 Grevillea diminuta
 Grevillea dimorpha
 Grevillea disjuncta
 Grevillea divaricata
 Grevillea diversifolia
 Grevillea diversifolia subsp. diversifolia
 Grevillea diversifolia subsp. subtersericata
 Grevillea donaldiana
 Grevillea drummondii
 Grevillea dryandri
 Grevillea dryandri subsp. dasycarpa
 Grevillea dryandri subsp. dryandri
 Grevillea dryandroides
 Grevillea dryophylla
 Grevillea endlicheriana
 Grevillea erectiloba
 Grevillea erinacea
 Grevillea eriobotrya
 Grevillea eriostachya
 Grevillea eryngioides
 Grevillea erythroclada
 Grevillea evansiana
 Grevillea excelsior
 Grevillea extorris
 Grevillea fasciculata
 Grevillea fistulosa
 Grevillea flexuosa
 Grevillea floribunda
 Grevillea floripendula
 Grevillea formosa
 Grevillea fulgens
 Grevillea georgeana
 Grevillea glauca
 Grevillea globosa
 Grevillea glossadenia
 Grevillea goodii
 Grevillea gordoniana
 Grevillea granulosa
 Grevillea hakeoides
 Grevillea hakeoides subsp. hakeoides
 Grevillea hakeoides subsp. stenophylla
 Grevillea halmaturina
 Grevillea haplantha
 Grevillea heliosperma
 Grevillea helmsiae
 Grevillea hilliana
 Grevillea hookeriana
 Grevillea huegelii
 Grevillea iaspicula
 Grevillea ilicifolia
 Grevillea inconspicua
 Grevillea incrassata
 Grevillea infecunda
 Grevillea infundibularis
 Grevillea insignis
 Grevillea integrifolia
 Grevillea intricata
 Grevillea involucrata
 Grevillea jephcottii
 Grevillea johnsonii
 Grevillea juncifolia
 Grevillea juniperina
 Grevillea kenneallyi
 Grevillea kennedyana
 Grevillea lanigera
 Grevillea latifolia
 Grevillea laurifolia
 Grevillea lavandulacea
 Grevillea leiophylla
 Grevillea leptobotrys
 Grevillea leptopoda
 Grevillea leucoclada
 Grevillea leucopteris
 Grevillea linearifolia
 Grevillea linsmithii
 Grevillea lissopleura
 Grevillea longicuspis
 Grevillea longifolia
 Grevillea longistyla
 Grevillea lullfitzii
 Grevillea makinsonii
 Grevillea manglesii
 Grevillea manglesioides
 Grevillea manglesioides subsp. manglesioides
 Grevillea maxwellii
 Grevillea micrantha
 Grevillea microstegia
 Grevillea mimosoides
 Grevillea miniata
 Grevillea minutiflora
 Grevillea miqueliana
 Grevillea molyneuxii
 Grevillea montana
 Grevillea monticola
 Grevillea montis-cole
 Grevillea montis-cole subsp. brevistyla
 Grevillea montis-cole subsp. montis-cole
 Grevillea mucronulata
 Grevillea muelleri
 Grevillea murex
 Grevillea muricata
 Grevillea myosodes
 Grevillea nana
 Grevillea nana subsp. abbreviata
 Grevillea nana subsp. nana
 Grevillea nematophylla
 Grevillea neurophylla
 Grevillea newbeyi
 Grevillea nudiflora
 Grevillea obliquistigma
 Grevillea obtecta
 Grevillea obtusiflora
 Grevillea obtusiflora subsp. obtusiflora
 Grevillea obtusifolia
 Grevillea occidentalis
 Grevillea oldei
 Grevillea oleoides
 Grevillea oligantha
 Grevillea olivacea
 Grevillea oncogyne
 Grevillea paniculata
 Grevillea paradoxa
 Grevillea parallela
 Grevillea parallelinervis
 Grevillea parviflora
 Grevillea patentiloba
 Grevillea patulifolia
 Grevillea pauciflora
 Grevillea pauciflora subsp. pauciflora
 Grevillea pauciflora subsp. psilophylla
 Grevillea pauciflora subsp. saxatilis
 Grevillea pectinata
 Grevillea petrophiloides
 Grevillea petrophiloides subsp. magnifica
 Grevillea petrophiloides subsp. petrophiloides
 Grevillea phanerophlebia
 Grevillea phillipsiana
 Grevillea phylicoides
 Grevillea pilosa
 Grevillea pilosa subsp. pilosa
 Grevillea pilulifera
 Grevillea pimeleoides
 Grevillea pinaster
 Grevillea pinifolia
 Grevillea pityophylla
 Grevillea plurijuga
 Grevillea polyacida
 Grevillea polybotrya
 Grevillea polybractea
 Grevillea prasina
 Grevillea preissii
 Grevillea prostrata
 Grevillea psilantha
 Grevillea pteridifolia
 Grevillea pterosperma
 Grevillea pulchella
 Grevillea pungens
 Grevillea pyramidalis
 Grevillea quercifolia
 Grevillea quinquenervis
 Grevillea ramosissima
 Grevillea refracta
 Grevillea renwickiana
 Grevillea repens
 Grevillea ripicola
 Grevillea rivularis
 Grevillea robusta
 Grevillea rogersoniana
 Grevillea rosieri
 Grevillea rosmarinifolia
 Grevillea roycei
 Grevillea rubicunda
 Grevillea rudis
 Grevillea saccata
 Grevillea sarissa
 Grevillea sarissa subsp. anfractifolia
 Grevillea sarissa subsp. bicolor
 Grevillea sarissa subsp. rectitepala
 Grevillea sarissa subsp. sarissa
 Grevillea sarissa subsp. succincta
 Grevillea sarissa subsp. umbellifera
 Grevillea scabra
 Grevillea scabrida
 Grevillea scapigera
 Grevillea scortechinii
 Grevillea scortechinii subsp. sarmentosa
 Grevillea scortechinii subsp. scortechinii
 Grevillea secunda
 Grevillea sericea
 Grevillea sessilis
 Grevillea shiressii
 Grevillea shuttleworthiana
 Grevillea singuliflora
 Grevillea sparsiflora
 Grevillea speciosa
 Grevillea sphacelata
 Grevillea spinosa
 Grevillea spinosissima
 Grevillea steiglitziana
 Grevillea stenobotrya
 Grevillea stenomera
 Grevillea stenostachya
 Grevillea striata
 Grevillea subtiliflora
 Grevillea synapheae
 Grevillea tenuiflora
 Grevillea tenuiloba
 Grevillea teretifolia
 Grevillea tetragonoloba
 Grevillea tetrapleura
 Grevillea thelemanniana
 Grevillea thyrsoides
 Grevillea trachytheca
 Grevillea treueriana
 Grevillea trifida
 Grevillea triloba
 Grevillea tripartita
 Grevillea triternata
 Grevillea umbellulata
 Grevillea uncinulata
 Grevillea variifolia
 Grevillea velutinella
 Grevillea venusta
 Grevillea versicolor
 Grevillea vestita
 Grevillea vestita subsp. isopogoides
 Grevillea vestita subsp. vestita
 Grevillea victoriae
 Grevillea whiteana
 Grevillea wickhamii
 Grevillea wickhamii subsp. aprica
 Grevillea wickhamii subsp. wickhamii
 Grevillea willisii
 Grevillea wilsonii
 Grevillea wittweri
 Grevillea yorkrakinensis
 Hakea
 Hakea aculeata
 Hakea adnata
 Hakea aenigma
 Hakea ambigua
 Hakea amplexicaulis
 Hakea arborescens
 Hakea auriculata
 Hakea bakeriana
 Hakea baxteri
 Hakea brachyptera
 Hakea brownii
 Hakea bucculenta
 Hakea candolleana
 Hakea carinata
 Hakea ceratophylla
 Hakea chordophylla
 Hakea cinerea
 Hakea circumalata
 Hakea clavata
 Hakea collina
 Hakea commutata
 Hakea conchifolia
 Hakea constablei
 Hakea corymbosa
 Hakea costata
 Hakea cristata
 Hakea cucullata
 Hakea cyclocarpa
 Hakea cycloptera
 Hakea cygna
 Hakea cygna subsp. cygna
 Hakea cygna subsp. needlei
 Hakea dactyloides
 Hakea decurrens
 Hakea denticulata
 Hakea divaricata
 Hakea drupacea
 Hakea ednieana
 Hakea elliptica
 Hakea epiglottis
 Hakea erecta
 Hakea eriantha
 Hakea erinacea
 Hakea eyreana
 Hakea falcata
 Hakea falcata var. subuninervis
 Hakea ferruginea
 Hakea flabellifolia
 Hakea florida
 Hakea florida var. florida
 Hakea florulenta
 Hakea francisiana
 Hakea fraseri
 Hakea gibbosa
 Hakea gilbertii
 Hakea grammatophylla
 Hakea hookeriana
 Hakea ilicifolia
 Hakea incrassata
 Hakea ivoryi
 Hakea laevipes
 Hakea lasiantha
 Hakea lasianthoides
 Hakea lasiocarpha
 Hakea laurina
 Hakea lehmanniana
 Hakea leucoptera
 Hakea linearis
 Hakea lissocarpha
 Hakea lissosperma
 Hakea loranthifolia
 Hakea lorea
 Hakea macraeana
 Hakea macrocarpa
 Hakea marginata
 Hakea megalosperma
 Hakea meisneriana
 Hakea microcarpa
 Hakea minyma
 Hakea mitchellii
 Hakea myrtoides
 Hakea neurophylla
 Hakea nitida
 Hakea nodosa
 Hakea obliqua
 Hakea obtusa
 Hakea oldfieldii
 Hakea oleifolia
 Hakea orthorrhyncha
 Hakea orthorrhyncha var. filiformis
 Hakea orthorrhyncha var. orthorrhyncha
 Hakea pachyphylla
 Hakea pandanicarpa
 Hakea pedunculata
 Hakea persiehana
 Hakea petiolaris
 Hakea platysperma
 Hakea plurinervia
 Hakea polyanthema
 Hakea preissii
 Hakea pritzelii
 Hakea propinqua
 Hakea prostrata
 Hakea pulvinifera
 Hakea purpurea
 Hakea pycnoneura
 Hakea recurva
 Hakea repullulans
 Hakea rhombales
 Hakea rostrata
 Hakea rugosa
 Hakea ruscifolia
 Hakea salicifolia
 Hakea scoparia
 Hakea sericea
 Hakea smilacifolia
 Hakea standleyensis
 Hakea stenocarpa
 Hakea stenophylla
 Hakea strumosa
 Hakea subsulcata
 Hakea sulcata
 Hakea tephrosperma
 Hakea teretifolia
 Hakea trifurcata
 Hakea trineura
 Hakea tuberculata
 Hakea ulicina
 Hakea undulata
 Hakea varia
 Hakea verrucosa
 Hakea victoria
 Hakea vittata
 Helicia
 Helicia australasica
 Helicia blakei
 Helicia ferruginea
 Helicia glabriflora
 Helicia grayi
 Helicia lamingtoniana
 Helicia lewisensis
 Helicia nortoniana
 Helicia recurva
 Hicksbeachia
 Hicksbeachia pilosa
 Hicksbeachia pinnatifolia
 Hollandaea 
 Hollandaea diabolica 
 Hollandaea porphyrocarpa 
 Hollandaea riparia 
 Hollandaea sayeriana  (type species)
 Isopogon
 Isopogon adenanthoides
 Isopogon alcicornis
 Isopogon anemonifolius
 Isopogon anethifolius
 Isopogon asper
 Isopogon attenuatus
 Isopogon axillaris
 Isopogon baxteri
 Isopogon buxifolius
 Isopogon buxifolius var. buxifolius
 Isopogon buxifolius var. linearis
 Isopogon buxifolius var. obovatus
 Isopogon buxifolius var. spathulatis
 Isopogon ceratophyllus
 Isopogon crithmifolius
 Isopogon cuneatus
 Isopogon dawsonii
 Isopogon divergens
 Isopogon drummondii
 Isopogon dubius
 Isopogon fletcheri
 Isopogon formosus
 Isopogon linearis
 Isopogon longifolius
 Isopogon mnoraifolius
 Isopogon petiolaris
 Isopogon polycephalus
 Isopogon prostratus
 Isopogon scabriusculus
 Isopogon sphaerocephalus
 Isopogon teretifolius
 Isopogon tridens
 Isopogon trilobus
 Isopogon uncinatus
 Isopogon villosus
 Lasjia 
 Lasjia claudiensis 
 Lasjia grandis 
 Lasjia whelanii 
 Lambertia
 Lambertia echinata
 Lambertia ericifolia
 Lambertia fairallii
 Lambertia formosa
 Lambertia ilicifolia
 Lambertia inermis
 Lambertia multiflora
 Lambertia orbifolia
 Lambertia rariflora
 Lambertia uniflora
 Lomatia
 Lomatia arborescens
 Lomatia fraseri
 Lomatia fraxinifolia
 Lomatia ilicifolia
 Lomatia myricoides
 Lomatia polymorpha
 Lomatia silaifolia
 Lomatia tasmanica
 Lomatia tinctoria
 Macadamia 
 Macadamia integrifolia 
 Macadamia jansenii 
 Macadamia ternifolia 
 Macadamia tetraphylla 
 Megahertzia 
 Megahertzia amplexicaulis 
 Musgravea
 Musgravea heterophylla
 Musgravea stenostachya
 Neorites
 Neorites kevedianus
 Nothorites 
 Nothorites megacarpus 
 Opisthiolepis
 Opisthiolepis heterophylla
 Orites
 Orites acicularis
 Orites diversifolius
 Orites excelsus
 Orites lancifolius
 Orites milliganii
 Orites revolutus
 Persoonia
 Persoonia acerosa
 Persoonia acicularis
 Persoonia adenantha
 Persoonia amaliae
 Persoonia angustiflora
 Persoonia arborea
 Persoonia brachystylis
 Persoonia chamaepeuce
 Persoonia chamaepitys
 Persoonia comata
 Persoonia confertiflora
 Persoonia coriacea
 Persoonia cornifolia
 Persoonia curvifolia
 Persoonia daphnoides
 Persoonia dillwynioides
 Persoonia elliptica
 Persoonia falcata
 Persoonia fastigiata
 Persoonia flexifolia
 Persoonia glaucescens
 Persoonia graminea
 Persoonia gunnii
 Persoonia gunnii var. gunnii
 Persoonia hakeiformis
 Persoonia hirsuta
 Persoonia juniperina
 Persoonia juniperina var. brevifolia
 Persoonia juniperina var. juniperina
 Persoonia juniperina var. ulicina
 Persoonia lanceolata
 Persoonia laurina
 Persoonia leucopogon
 Persoonia levis
 Persoonia linearis
 Persoonia longifolia
 Persoonia marginata
 Persoonia media
 Persoonia microphylla
 Persoonia mollis
 Persoonia moscalii
 Persoonia muelleri
 Persoonia muelleri var. angustifolia
 Persoonia muelleri var. densifolia
 Persoonia muelleri var. muelleri
 Persoonia myrtilloides
 Persoonia myrtilloides subsp. myrtilloides
 Persoonia nutans
 Persoonia oblongata
 Persoonia oxycoccoides
 Persoonia pinifolia
 Persoonia prostrata
 Persoonia pungens
 Persoonia quinquenervis
 Persoonia recedens
 Persoonia rigida
 Persoonia rudis
 Persoonia rufiflora
 Persoonia saccata
 Persoonia saundersiana
 Persoonia scabra
 Persoonia sericea
 Persoonia silvatica
 Persoonia spathulata
 Persoonia stradbrokensis
 Persoonia striata
 Persoonia subvelutina
 Persoonia sulcata
 Persoonia tenuifolia
 Persoonia teretifolia
 Persoonia trinervis
 Persoonia virgata
 Petrophile
 Petrophile acicularis
 Petrophile anceps
 Petrophile axillaris
 Petrophile biloba
 Petrophile biternata
 Petrophile brevifolia
 Petrophile canescens
 Petrophile carduacea
 Petrophile chrysantha
 Petrophile circinata
 Petrophile conifera
 Petrophile crispata
 Petrophile divaricata
 Petrophile diversifolia
 Petrophile drummondii
 Petrophile ericifolia
 Petrophile fastigiata
 Petrophile filifolia
 Petrophile heterophylla
 Petrophile incurvata
 Petrophile juncifolia
 Petrophile linearis
 Petrophile longifolia
 Petrophile macrostachya
 Petrophile media
 Petrophile megalostegia
 Petrophile multisecta
 Petrophile pedunculata
 Petrophile phylicoides
 Petrophile plumosa
 Petrophile pulchella
 Petrophile rigida
 Petrophile scabriuscula
 Petrophile semifurcata
 Petrophile seminuda
 Petrophile serruriae
 Petrophile sessilis
 Petrophile shirleyae
 Petrophile shuttleworthiana
 Petrophile squamata
 Petrophile striata
 Petrophile teretifolia
 Placospermum
 Placospermum coriaceum
 Sphalmium
 Sphalmium racemosum
 Stenocarpus
 Stenocarpus acacioides
 Stenocarpus angustifolius 
 Stenocarpus cryptocarpus
 Stenocarpus cunninghamii
 Stenocarpus davallioides
 Stenocarpus reticulatus
 Stenocarpus salignus
 Stenocarpus sinuatus
 Stenocarpus verticis 
 Stirlingia
 Stirlingia abrotanoides
 Stirlingia anethifolia
 Stirlingia latifolia
 Stirlingia simplex
 Stirlingia tenuifolia
 Strangea
 Strangea cynanchicarpa
 Strangea linearis
 Strangea stenocarpoides
 Symphionema
 Symphionema montanum
 Symphionema paludosum
 Synaphea
 Synaphea acutiloba
 Synaphea decorticans
 Synaphea drummondii
 Synaphea favosa
 Synaphea gracillima
 Synaphea petiolaris
 Synaphea pinnata
 Synaphea polymorpha
 Synaphea preissii
 Synaphea reticulata
 Synaphea spinulosa
 Telopea
 Telopea aspera
 Telopea mongaensis
 Telopea oreades
 Telopea speciosissima
 Telopea truncata
 Triunia
 Triunia erythrocarpa
 Triunia montana
 Triunia robusta
 Triunia youngiana
 Xylomelum
 Xylomelum angustifolium
 Xylomelum cunninghamianum
 Xylomelum occidentale
 Xylomelum pyriforme
 Xylomelum scottianum

References

Australian Proteaceae
Australia
Proteaceae